Rezky may refer to:

People
Rezky Ikhwan (born 1993), Indonesian footballer
Rezza Rezky (born 2000), Singaporean footballer

Ships
Soviet destroyer Rezky (1940), a Gnevny-class destroyer
Rezkiy, a Russian Steregushchiy-class corvette